Giulio Romano (– 1 November 1546), is the acquired name of Giulio Pippi, who was an Italian painter and architect. He was a pupil of Raphael, and his stylistic deviations from High Renaissance classicism help define the sixteenth-century style known as Mannerism. Giulio's drawings have long been treasured by collectors; contemporary prints of them engraved by Marcantonio Raimondi were a significant contribution to the spread of sixteenth-century Italian style throughout Europe.

Biography 

Giulio Pippi was born in Rome and he began his career there as a young assistant to the renown Renaissance artist, Raphael. He was an important member of Raphael's studio. He worked on the frescos in the Vatican loggias using designs by Raphael and, in Raphael's Stanze in the Vatican, painted a group of figures in the Fire in the Borgo fresco. He also collaborated on the decoration of the ceiling of the Villa Farnesina. Despite his relative youth, increasingly he became indispensable to the master and after the death of Raphael in 1520, he helped complete the Vatican frescoes of the life of Constantine as well as Raphael's Coronation of the Virgin and the Transfiguration in the Vatican. In Rome, Giulio decorated the Villa Madama for Cardinal Giuliano de' Medici, afterward Clement VII. The crowded frescoes he designed lack the stately and serene simplicity of his master.

On Raphael's death, Michelangelo attempted to take over completion of the commission for the Raphael Rooms at the Vatican, but along with Perino del Vaga, Giulio was able to keep it, as they had the drawings for much of the uncompleted work that was being executed under the supervision of Raphael.

From 1522 he was courted by Federico Gonzaga, ruler of Mantua, who wanted him as court artist, apparently especially attracted by his skill as an architect. The contemporaneous historian of the Renaissance, Giorgio Vasari (1511–1574), tells how Baldassare Castiglione was delegated by Gonzaga to procure Giulio to execute paintings as well as architectural and engineering projects for the duchy of Mantua. In late 1524, Giulio agreed to move to Mantua, where he remained for the rest of his life. In Mantua, rather than his given name, "Giulio Romano" was used to identify him by his geographical origin because he was not a native artist. Mantua is where he executed his most well-known work, hence that name became associated with him thereafter. His work in Rome was not affected by the disaster of the Sack of Rome in 1527, however, the sacking hugely disrupted artistic patronage in Rome and eventually would disperse the remains of Raphael's workshop.

His masterpiece of architecture and fresco painting in Mantua is the suburban Palazzo Te, with its famous illusionistic frescos (c. 1525–1535) and his use of the Palladian motif for arches used in the design. He also helped rebuild the ducal palace in Mantua, reconstructed the cathedral, and designed the nearby Church of San Benedetto. Giulio sculpted the figure of Christ that is positioned above Castiglione's tomb in the church of Santa Maria delle Grazie near Mantua. Sections of Mantua that had been flood-prone were refurbished under Giulio's direction and the duke's patronage and friendship never faltered. The studio he established in Mantua became a popular school of art. Giulio's annual income amounted to more than 1000 ducats.

In Renaissance tradition, many works by Giulio were only temporary. According to Vasari:

He traveled to France in the first half of the sixteenth century and brought concepts of the Italian style to the French court of Francis I.

Giulio designed tapestries as well. It also is rumored that he contributed to a collection of drawings upon which an album entitled, I Modi, was engraved by Marcantonio Raimondi. All of those original drawings are said to have been destroyed because the content was no longer considered socially acceptable.

Giulio Romano has the distinction of being the only Renaissance artist to be mentioned by William Shakespeare. In Act V, Scene II of The Winter's Tale, the statue of Queen Hermione that was described as coming to life during the play was identified by the bard as having been sculpted by "that rare Italian master, Julio Romano".

He died in Mantua in 1546. According to Vasari, his best pupils were Giovanni dal Lione, Raffaellino dal Colle, Benedetto Pagni, Figurino da Faenza, Giovanni Battista Bertani and his brother Rinaldo, and Fermo Guisoni.

Architecture 
On the whole, Giulio was more influential as an architect than as a painter and his works had an enormous impact on Italian Mannerist architecture. He learned architecture the same way he learned painting, as an increasingly trusted assistant to Raphael, who was appointed the papal architect in 1514 and his early works are very much in Raphael's style. The project for the Villa Madama outside Rome, built by the future Medici Pope Clement VII was given to Giulio on Raphael's death. It already shows his taste for playful surprises within the style of Renaissance classical architecture. Planned on a huge scale, it was incomplete by the Sack of Rome, and never finished.

The Villa Lante al Gianicolo (1520–21) was a smaller suburban villa in Rome, with a famous view over the city. Romano made the whole building suggest lightness and elegance to exploit the ridge-top position and to overcome the rather small Roman footprint. The orders are delicate, with Tuscan or Doric columns and pilasters in pairs on the main floor, and extremely shallow Ionic pilasters above, whose presence is mainly conveyed by a different colour. Alternate loggia openings are heightened by arches above the entablature. Romano's willingness to play with the conventions of the classical orders is already in evidence; the Doric here has guttae, but no triglyphs, on its narrow entablature. The volutes of the Ionic capitals are repeated in the window surrounds between them: "The canonic orders here begin to be treated visually as independent from their structural purposes, and this liberation offered the architect new expressive possibilities."

The rustication and exaggerated size of keystones that were to be so prominent in his later buildings in Mantua, are already present on the ground floor, which dispenses with any classical order, but the two upper floors have increasingly shallow orders in pilasters, somewhat in the manner of the Villa Lante.

His first building in Mantua has remained his most famous work in architecture. The Palazzo del Te was a pleasure palace outside the city that was begun around 1524 and completed a decade later. Here Giulio was able, because of the function of the building, to indulge to the full his playful inventiveness.

Selected paintings and drawings 
Deesis with Saint Paul and Saint Catherine - Parma
The Stoning of St. Stephen (Santo Stefano, Genoa): "Giulio never did a finer work than this," said Vasari. Domenico del Barbiere engraved the subject, so that it influenced designers who never saw the original in Genoa.
Adoration of the Magi (Louvre)
Fire in the Borgo, fresco (Raphael Rooms in Vatican City)
Emblematic Figures, pen and brown ink and wash over graphite (Fine Arts Museum of San Francisco)
Portrait of a Young Woman, after a design by Raphael, and later modified by Raphael (Musée des Beaux-Arts de Strasbourg)
The Battle of the Milvian Bridge
The Triumph of Titus and Vespasian
Portrait of Doña Isabel de Requesens y Enriquez de Cardona-Anglesola
Madonna of the Cat (National Museum of Capodimonte, Naples, 1522–23)
Noli me tangere, Prado Museum, Madrid
Adoration of the Shepherds in collaboration with Giovanni Francesco Penni, Prado Museum, Madrid

Notes

References 
Talvacchia, Bette, "Giulio Romano." Grove Art Online, Oxford Art Online, Oxford University Press, accessed March 30, 2016, subscription required

External links 

Vita by Giorgio Vasari, who describes his meeting with Giulio:
"At this time Giorgio Vasari a great friend of Giulio, though they only knew each other by report and by letters, passed through Mantua on his way to Venice to see him and his works. On meeting, they recognised each other as though they had met a thousand times before. Giulio was so delighted that he spent four days in showing Vasari all his works, especially the plans of ancient buildings at Rome, Naples, Pozzuolo, Campagna, and all the other principal antiquities designed partly by him and partly by others. Then, opening a great cupboard, he showed him plans of all the buildings erected from his designs in Mantua, Rome and all Lombardy, so beautiful that I do not believe that more original, fanciful or convenient buildings exist."
The engravings of Giorgio Ghisi, a full text exhibition catalog from The Metropolitan Museum of Art, which contains material on Giulio Romano (see index)
 

Giulio Romano
16th-century Italian painters
Italian male painters
Italian Mannerist painters
Italian Mannerist architects
1490s births
1546 deaths
Painters from Rome
16th-century Italian architects